Christopher Lane is an American author whose books include the Inupiat Eskimo Mystery series.

Bibliography

Inupiat Eskimo Mystery series
 Elements of a Kill, Avon (1998)  
 Season of Death, Avon (1999) 
 A Shroud of Midnight Sun, Avon (2000) 
 Silent as the Hunter, Avon (2001) 
 A Deadly Quiet, Avon (2001)

Stand Alones
 Eden's Gate, Zondervan (1994) 
 Appearance of Evil, Zondervan (1997)  
 Tonopah, Zondervan (1999)

References

20th-century American novelists
21st-century American novelists
American mystery novelists
Living people
American male novelists
20th-century American male writers
21st-century American male writers
Year of birth missing (living people)